María Xesús Pato Díaz (born 29 August 1955, in Ourense, Galicia), most commonly known as Chus Pato, is a Galician writer.

Biography
Pato is an important figure in Galician culture: she belongs to literary groups and cultural associations, such as PEN Club and Redes Escarlata. She is a member of the Royal Galician Academy since 2016. She also participated directly in politics.

Career
Chus Pato's works go beyond the traditional concept of poetry since her writings bear signs of postmodern transgression of literary genres. She uses different text types—biography, essay, excerpts from theatre, interview, radio programs—which allows her to engage a large variety of voices that include, as well as hers, those of many other real and fictitious characters.

Her works are a clear mirror of a literary commitment to ideological claims. Galician nationalism, a Marxist vision of reality, and feminist theory influence the themes she deals with. She also thinks about language as a system of symbolic creation in modern society.

Her style is characterized by syncopated syntax and references to Greco-Latin mythology so that she uses language as a metaphor of immediate reality.

Pato collaborates with many literary magazines, such as Festa da palabra silenciada, Luzes da Galiza, A Trabe de Ouro, etc. and she has written books (Palabra de muller, Poesía dos aléns) in collaboration with other authors.

Some of her poems are also included in the anthologies Poésie en Galice aujourd’hui; Rías de tinta; Literatura de mujeres en francés, gallego e italiano; Poetry is the world’s great miracle...

Bibliography

Galician language
Urania. Ourense: Calpurnia (1991)
Heloísa. A Coruña: Espiral Maior (1994)
Fascinio. Muros: Toxosoutos (1995)
A ponte das poldras. Santiago de Compostela: Noitarenga (1996). 2nd ed., Vigo: Galaxia (2006)
Nínive. Vigo: Xerais (1996)
m-Talá. Vigo: Xerais (2000)
Charenton. Vigo: Xerais (2004)
Hordas de escritura. Vigo: Xerais (2008)
Secesión. Vigo: Galaxia (2009).
Nacer é unha república de árbores. Pontevedra: Do Cumio (2010)
Carne de Leviatán. Vigo: Galaxia (2013).
Un libre favor. Vigo: Galaxia (2019).

English translations
From M-Talá. Vancouver: Nomados (2002)
Charenton. Exeter: Shearsman Books (2007)
m-Talá. Exeter: Shearsman Books (2009)
Hordes of Writing, Exeter: Shearsman Books (2011)
Secession, (a dual publication with Erín Moure's Insecession), Toronto: BookThug (2014).
Flesh of Leviatan, Omnidawn Publishing (2016).
The Face of the Quarzes, Veliz Books (2021).

Dutch translations
 Finisterra. Uitgeverij Perdu, 2017.

Portuguese translations
 Carne de Leviatã. Lisboa: Douda Correria, 2016.
 Um fémur de voz corre a galope [antologia]. Porto: Officium Lectionis, 2022.

Bulgarian translations
 Leviatan i drugi istorii. Small Stations, 2016.

Awards
Premio Losada Diéguez in 1997 for Nínive.
Spanish Critic Prize in 2009 for Hordas de escritura.
Premio Losada Diéguez in 2009 for Hordas de escritura
Author of the Year in 2014 from the Galician Booksellers' Association.

References

External links
Page in Shearsman Books 
Page in BookThug Books

1955 births
Living people
Galician poets
Spanish women poets
People from Ourense